Manx Americans are Americans of full or partial Manx ancestral origin or Manx people who reside in the United States of America.

Settlement in Ohio
The city of Cleveland, Ohio is said to have the highest concentration of Americans of Manx descent in the United States. They predominantly descend from the village of Andreas on the northern side in the Isle of Man. From 1822 onwards, many families such as the Corlett family, becoming farmers and easing land by the Connecticut Land Company. In 1826 more families such as the Kelley’s, Teare’s, and Kneen’s established themselves in Newburgh which would encourage more Manx settlement into the area. Cleveland was a town of only six hundred people. A population grew to around 3000 of both Manx-born or of Manx descent bound together by their Manx language and customs. Amongst the immigrants was William Corlett who donated land for the community's log schoolhouse so Manx children would be educated in their native Manx and English languages.

Notable people

 Dan Auerbach (born 1979), singer and guitarist of the Black Keys
 John Thomas Caine (1829-1911), politician in the state of Utah
 Cannon family, prominent political family in Utah (see page for individual members)
 William Christian (1743-1786), Virginia soldier and frontiersman
 Leslie Cockburn (born 1952), writer and filmmaker
 John Cubbins (1827-1894), businessman and politician in Tennessee
 William Garrett (1842-1916), fought in the American Civil War
 William Kennish (1799-1862), scientist and explorer
 Elizabeth Holloway Marston (1893-1993), psychologist
 Jeremiah McGuire (1823-1889), politician and lawyer in New York
 Ben Quayle (born 1976), former U.S. Congressman and son of Dan Quayle
 Dan Quayle (born 1947), Vice President of the United States from 1989 until 1993
 James C. Quayle (1921-2000), businessman and father of Dan Quayle
 William Edward Quine (1847-1922)
 Christopher Stott (born 1969), space entrepreneur
 Kevin Teare (born 1951), artist
 Letitia Christian Tyler (1790-1842), first wife of U.S. President John Tyler
 John Ambrose Watterson (1844-1899), Catholic bishop

References 

 
 
Manx diaspora